Marmande is a railway station in Marmande, Nouvelle-Aquitaine, France. The station is located on the Bordeaux–Sète railway and Marmande-Mont-de-Marsan railway lines. The station is served by Intercités (long distance, also night train) and TER (local) services operated by SNCF. The Mont-de-Marsan line only runs up to Casteljaloux; the section beyond Casteljaloux has been demolished.

Train services
The following services currently call at Marmande:
intercity services (Intercités) Bordeaux - Toulouse - Montpellier - Marseille 
local service (TER Nouvelle-Aquitaine) Bordeaux - Langon - Marmande - Agen

References

Railway stations in Lot-et-Garonne